Henry of France (circa 1121 – 13 November 1175), bishop of Beauvais (1149–1161), then archbishop of Reims (1161–1175), was the third son of King Louis VI of France and Adelaide of Maurienne.

As the third son of the king (and, on his mother's side, the great-nephew of Pope Calixtus II) Henry was destined for a place in the church from an early age, tonsured at the age of thirteen and ordained two years later. He advanced by stages through the church hierarchy (becoming abbot of several royal monasteries, holding various dignities which were in the King's gift), probably with a view to preparing him for a position of the highest rank, befitting the son of a king. In 1146, however, he was converted from his life as a very wealthy "secular" cleric by St. Bernard of Clairvaux and entered Clairvaux Abbey as an ordinary monk. Pope Eugenius III, himself a former Cistercian monk, speaks of Henry in 1147 as humbly washing dishes at Clairvaux. His position as abbot of the collegiate churches was bestowed upon his younger brother Philip.

In 1149, on the death of Bishop Odo III of Beauvais, the cathedral chapter, persuaded by Bernard of Clairvaux, elected Henry as their bishop. Henry was ill-prepared for the political responsibilities of his new office, and came into conflict with the burghers of the city. King Louis backed the town, while Henry was supported by his younger brother Robert, Count of Dreux. The conflict was finally settled by Pope Eugenius III in 1151.

In 1161 Henry became Archbishop of Reims, succeeded at Beauvais by Bartholomew of Montcornet. Henry organised an important church council at Reims in 1164. He again found himself in conflict with the populace of his city, but was supported by his brother Louis. The revolt was suppressed and Archbishop Henry devoted himself to beautifying and fortifying Reims, which included building the castles of Septsaulx and Cormicy.

Notes

References
Demouy, Patrick. “Henri de France,” in Alfred Baudrillart, et al., eds., Dictionnaire d’histoire et de géographie ecclésiastiques, XXIII (1990), cols. 1129-1132.

. Henri de France, archevêque de Reims (1162-75). Biographie et recueil des actes. (Mémoire de maîtrise de l’Université de Reims, 1972.)

. “Henri de France et Louis VII. L’Évêque cistercien et son frère le roi,” [in Les Serviteurs de l’État au Moyen Âge. Actes du XXIXe Congrès de la Société des historiens médiévistes de l’enseignement supérieur public (Publications de la Sorbonne. Histoire ancienne et médiévale). Paris, 1999, pp. 47–61.

Ludwig Falkenstein, “Alexandre III et Henri de France: Conformités et conflits,” in: Rolf Grosse, ed., L’Eglise de France et la papauté (Xème-XIIIème siècle). (Studien und Dokumente zur Gallia pontificia/Etudes et documents pour servir à une Gallia pontificia, I). Bonn, 1993, pp. 103–176.

Dietrich Lohrmann, “Autour d’un acte d’Henri, évêque de Beauvais, concernant trois granges de Froidmont (1159),” in Michel Parisse, ed. A Propos des actes d’évêques: Hommage à Lucie Fossier. (Collection: Actes des Evêques de France). Nancy: Presses Universitaires de Nancy, 1991, pp. 161–167.

House of Capet
1120s births
1175 deaths
Bishops of Beauvais
Archbishops of Reims
12th-century Roman Catholic archbishops in France
Sons of kings